Julodis euphratica also known as the  Sulphrous jewel beetle or Euphratic jewel beetle, an insect from the order of beetles and a family of whippings. It measures from 29 to 31 mm. It feeds on nectar from wild flowers. The larvae of these beetles live in acacia trees, where they spend the year before pupating and emerging in the early spring to mate. The larval stage lasts about 9 months and the adults live for 3 months. The total lifespan of the beetle from egg to adult and death is approximately a year in length.

References

Buprestidae